The Olympic Cup (French: Coupe olympique) is an award given annually by the International Olympic Committee.

It was instituted by Pierre de Coubertin in 1906 and is awarded to an institution or association with a record of merit and integrity in actively developing the Olympic Movement.

Its recipients have included amateur sports clubs, schools, newspapers and national sporting administrations, though it is primarily awarded to groups connected with the organization of the Olympic Games.

Recipients of the Olympic Cup

 1906 — Touring Club de France
 1907 — Henley Royal Regatta
 1908 — Swedish Central Association for the Promotion of Sports
 1909 — German Gymnastics
 1910 — The Sokol movement
 1911 — Touring Club Italiano
 1912 — Union of Gymnastics Societies of France
 1913 — Hungarian Athletic Club
 1914 — Amateur Athletic Union of America
 1915 — Rugby School
 1916 — Confrérie Saint-Michel de Gand
 1917 — Dutch Football Association
 1918 — Sports Teams of the Allied Front
 1919 — Olympic Institute of Lausanne
 1920 — Y.M.C.A. International College, Springfield
 1921 — Danish Sports Federation
 1922 — Amateur Athletic Union of Canada
 1923 — Sports Association of Catalonia
 1924 — Athletic and Gymnastic Federation of Finland
 1925 — National Physical Education Committee of Uruguay
 1926 — Norwegian Skiing Federation
 1927 — Colonel Robert M. Thomson
 1928 — Junta Nacional Mexicana
 1929 — YMCA World Committee
 1930 — Swiss Football and Athletic Association
 1931 — National Playing Fields Association, Great Britain
 1932 — German College of Physical Education
 1933 — Swiss Federal Society of Gymnastics
 1934 — Opera Nazionale Dopolavoro
 1935 — National Recreation and Park Association
 1936 — Hellenic Amateur Athletic Association
 1937 — Austrian Skating Union
 1938 — Royal Academy of Physical Education of Hungary
 1939 — Strength through Joy
 1940 — Swedish Gymnastics
 1941 — Finnish Olympic Committee
 1942 — William May Garland
 1943 — Argentine Olympic Committee
 1944 — City of Lausanne
 1945 — Norwegian Athletics Association
 1946 — Olympic Committee of Colombia
 1947 — J. Sigfrid Edström, President of the IOC
 1948 — Central Council of Physical Recreation
 1949 — Fluminense Football Club
 1950 — Belgian Olympic Committee
 1950 — New Zealand Olympic and British Empire Games Association
 1951 — Académie des Sports, Paris
 1952 — City of Oslo
 1953 — City of Helsinki
 1954 — Federal School of Gymnastics and Sports of Switzerland
 1955 — Organizing Committee of the 1954 Central American and Caribbean Games
 1955 — Organizing Committee of the 1955 Pan American Games
 1956 — No award
 1957 — Silent Sports Federation of Italy
 1958 — No award
 1959 — Panathlon Italiano, Genoa
 1960 — Italian University Sports Centre
 1961 — Helms Hall Foundation, Los Angeles
 1962 — Organizing Committee of the 1961 Bolivarian Games
 1963 — Australian British Empire and Commonwealth Games Association
 1964 — Southern Californian Committee for the Olympic Games, Los Angeles
 1965 — City of Tokyo
 1966 — International Committee of Silent Sports
 1967 — Bolivarian Games
 1968 — People of Mexico City
 1969 — Polish Olympic Committee
 1970 — Organizing Committee of the 1966 and 1970 Asian Games
 1971 — Organizing Committee of the 1971 Pan American Games
 1972 — Turkish Olympic Committee
 1972 — City of Sapporo
 1973 — People of Munich
 1974 — Bulgarian Olympic Committee
 1975 — Italian National Olympic Committee
 1976 — Czechoslovakian Physical Culture and Sports Federation
 1977 — Olympic Committee of Ivory Coast
 1978 — Hellenic Olympic Committee
 1979 — Organizing Committee of the 1978 World Rowing Championships in New Zealand
 1980 — Ginásio Clube Portugues
 1981 — Swiss Confederation, International Olympic Academy
 1982 — Racing Club de France
 1983 — Puerto Rico Olympic Committee
 1984 — Organizing Committee of the 1983 World Championships in Athletics
 1985 — Chinese Olympic Committee
 1986 — City of Stuttgart
 1988 — L'Équipe
 1988 — People of Australia
 1989 — City of Seoul
 1989 — La Gazzetta dello Sport
 1990 — Panellinios Athletic Club in Athens
 1991 — Japanese Olympic Committee
 1992 — Department of Savoie
 1992 — City of Barcelona
 1993 — Monégasque Olympic Committee
 1994 — French National Olympic and Sports Committee
 1994 — People of Norway
 1995 — Korean Sport & Olympic Committee
 1996 — City of Baden-Baden
 1997 — No award
 1998 — People of Nagano
 1999 — United Nations Organization
 2000 — City of Sydney
 2001 — Kip Keino School, Eldoret
 2002 — People of Salt Lake City
 2003 — Team Alinghi
 2004 — People of Athens
 2005 — Lake Placid Winter Olympic Museum
 2006 — People of Turin
 2007 — Lake Placid Winter Olympic Museum
 2008 — The citizens of Beijing
 2009 —
 2010 — People of Singapore
 2011 — South African Sports Confederation and Olympic Committee and the people of Durban
 2012 — The citizens of London
 2016 — People of the city of Rio de Janeiro
 2018 — People of the city of Buenos Aires
 2022 — People of the People's Republic of China

See also
 Olympic Order
 Pierre de Coubertin medal

References

External links
IOC Official Website
List of recipients to 1948

Olympic culture
Sports trophies and awards
International Olympic Committee
Awards established in 1906
1906 establishments in France